Air Assault on Crete is a wargame published by Avalon Hill in 1977 that simulates the Battle of Crete during World War II.

Description
Air Assault on Crete is a two-player wargame that simulates the German paratroop attack on Crete on May 20, 1941; one player takes on the defense of Crete by Allied forces, and the other player controls the invading German forces. The game provides a series of scenarios designed to simulate the various skirmishes and battles over the ten-day campaign at a company/battalion level. The 3-part  mapboard uses a hex grid scaled to 1.6 kilometres per hex. Other components include a 24-page rulebook and over 500 die-cut counters.

Each turn, the German player completes five phases, and then the Allied player completes three phases:
 German Play Segment
 Aircraft Placement & Bombardment Phase
 Airborne Assault and Air Landing Phase
 Sea Movement Phase
 Movement Phase
 Combat Phase
 Allied Play Segment
 Sea Movement Phase
 Movement Phase
 Combat Phase

Players can choose the Basic Game, with simplified rules and victory conditions, or the Advanced Game.

A separate bonus game, Invasion of Malta, 1942, is also included. The game simulates Operation Hercules, a proposed German invasion of Malta that was planned by the German High Staff but never initiated. This game has its own counters and a separate  mapboard, and uses the same rules system as Air Assault on Crete.

Victory conditions
In the Basic Game, if the Germans can seize one airfield and hold it for four turns, then the German player wins the game.

In the Advanced Game, there are several routes to victory:
 If the Germans fail to seize an airfield by Turn 8, then the Allied player wins.
 If the Germans seize an airfield by Turn 8, the Allied player can still win by successfully evacuating combatant and non-combatant units via any of seven designated escape routes on Turn 8 or later. If the Allied player has inflicted more than 75 German casualty losses, and has evacuated 80 casualty points in combat units or non-combatants after Turn 8, then the Allied player wins. If both of these conditions are not met, then the German player wins.

Reception
In the November–December 1978 issue of The Phoenix (Issue 16), Ralph Vickers called Air Assault on Crete "a good game for exercising your skills of simulating your own plans and out-guessing your opponent." While Vickers found most of the rules had "good internal logic", he criticized one rule about evacuation that prevented non-combatant units from leaving their initial sector until Turn 8, saying, "What rationale can make this convincing and realistic?" While Vickers agreed that without this rule, the game "won't hang together", he called the rule "hocus-pocus". Despite this fault, Vickers concluded by giving the game a thumbs up, saying, "this is a game that is going to stay high on the popularity charts for a long time."

In The General, Vance von Borries pointed out that even if the German player is able to capture one or more airfields, the game is far from over if the Allied player can evacuate as quickly as possible. "Although the German player has the unique ability to launch [a] humiliating aerial envelopment, the Commonwealth player can still turn that euphoric and overconfident airborne glory into a bloody fool holding an empty bag. Air Assault on Crete is, in that respect, probably the most satisfying wargame ever developed."

In his 1980 book  The Best of Board Wargaming , Nicholas Palmer noted that "The title game is varied and interesting, but it is really upstaged by the beautiful cameo game Invasion of Malta which AH throw into the same box as a bonus!" Although he found that "the simulation is colourful but not terribly convincing", he concluded by giving the game an excellent "excitement" rating of 100%, and a rules clarity rating of 90%, saying, "The intricate victory conditions make for a challenging players' game, ideal for working out subtle defences and assault plans in between games."

In the 1980 book The Complete Book of Wargames, game designer Jon Freeman called the game system "fairly basic and arguably dated [...] It has none of the insight of Simulations Publications' Descent on Crete, but it's a heck of a lot more fun to play." Freeman concluded by giving the game an Overall Evaluation of "Good", saying, "Sophisticated gamers may be somewhat disappointed, but most will enjoy the challenge of planning an invasion — or trying to repel it."  

In  The Escapist, John Keefer said, "The game does a good job of approximating the troop strengths, drops and reserves from the battle, offering several scenarios set over the course of the 10-day battle."

Further reviews
Campaign, Issue 85: "Thumbnail Analysis: Air Assault on Crete" (Don Lowry)
Campaign, Issue 86: "Review, Analysis and Impressions"  (John G. Alsen)
Fire & Movement, Issue 14: "Air Assault on Crete" (A. Doum)
The Wargamer, Vol. 1, #4: "Briefing: Air Assault on Crete" (Jack Greene)
 Casus Belli #5 (Sept 1981)

References

External links
 

Avalon Hill games
Board games introduced in 1977
Wargames introduced in 1977
World War II board wargames